György Károly (Károly György, 31 August 1953 – 26 October 2018) was a Hungarian poet and writer.

Biography
Károly was born in Budapest on 31 August 1953, the only son of György Károly (1924–2003), a butcher, and Ilona Szabó (1928–2014), a tailor. He spent his early life in Szigetszentmiklós, where he finished his primary school years. After he completed his studies in Budapest.
Károly was educated as a geologist and began to write in the 1970s. He published his first poems in Élet és Irodalom (“Life and Literature”). He was poetic silent in the 1980s. In the nineties Károly began writing again.

Bibliography

Books
 Károly György: Folyamatos május (poems, private edition, Budapest 1999)
 Károly György – Péter Péter: Dunakanyaró (poems, private edition, Vác 2005)

Anthologies
 Téli tárlat ’98 (Madách Imre Művelődési Központ, Vác 1998, 96 pages)
 Gondolattánc (Svájci-Magyar Kiadói Kft., Budapest 2000, 270 pages) 
 Szótól szóig (Alterra Svájci-Magyar Kiadó Kft., Budapest 2002, 340 pages) 
 A Dunakanyar költészete 2005 (Kucsák Könyvkötészet és Nyomda, Vác 2005, 199 pages) 
 Ezer magyar haiku (Napkút Kiadó, Budapest 2010, 332 pages)

Literary journals
 A Céh
 Árgus
 Bárka
 Béta magazin (β)
 C.E.T – Central European Time
 Duna-part
 Élet és Irodalom
 Havi Magyar fórum
 Hírnök
 Holmi
 Igazunk
 Madách Rádió
 Magyar Élet (New Zealand)
 Magyar Demokrata
 Magyar Fórum
 Magyar Napló
 Magyar Világ
 Mozgó Világ
 Műhely
 Napút
 Pannon Tükör
 Parnasszus
 Petőfi Rádió
 Új Pest megyei Hírlap
 Somogy
 Törökfürdő
 Új Hagyomány
 Váci Napló
 Váci Polgár

Personal life
Károly was married to Annamária Szklenkay (born 1958), with whom he had five children. They lived in Vác for twenty years, and in Pilis for three years before moving to Szigetszentmiklós. Károly died of a brain tumor on 26 October 2018.

References

External links (Hungarian texts)

 Official website of György Károly
 Terebess Online

 Assorted poems on Wikisource
 Sonnetset on Wikisource (Crown of sonnets)

1953 births
2018 deaths
Deaths from brain cancer in Hungary
Hungarian male poets
20th-century Hungarian male writers
20th-century Hungarian poets
21st-century Hungarian poets
21st-century Hungarian male writers
People from Budapest